Burra Katha, also spelled Burrakatha, is an oral storytelling technique in the Jangam Katha tradition, performed in villages of Andhra Pradesh and Telangana. The troupe consists of one main performer and two co-performers. It is a narrative entertainment that consists of prayers, solo drama, dance, songs, poems and jokes. The topic will be either a Hindu mythological story (Jangam Katha) or a contemporary social issue. It became popular art form during the Telangana Rebellion in the early 1930-1950.

Origin
The modern form of Burra Katha was developed in Guntur district around 1942 with the aim of propagating political ideas among illiterate masses in villages.

Etymology
"Burra" is referred to tambura, a musical string instrument with a hollow shell. "Katha" means story.

Burra means brain in Telugu. The shell resembles a human skull. It is made of baked clay or dried pumpkin, or of brass and copper. The instrument looks very similar to veena and the performer can pull and press strings to produce voices and get music.

History
Burrakatha started as devotional songs of nomadic people and became a popular art form. It is played on radio and TV regularly in Andhra Pradesh. It is a 20th-century name for the theater show known as Jangam Katha. The jangams lingayats were wandering minstrels who worshiped and sang of Lord Siva. Two performers participated in these plays: the storyteller and his wife. With societal and cultural changes, the secular aspect was incorporated into this form. The modern form has three performers of any gender.

Popular Hindu artists were Pendyala Venkateswarrao, Sunkara Sri Krishna Madhava Rao, Paruchuri Ramakotayya, Sirivisetti Subbarao, Kosuri Punnayya, Govardhana, Kakumanu Subbarao, Davuluru, Chintalal Suryanarayana, Budagajangala mote papaiah, Budagajangala mote kullayappa, Budagajangala mote ramalingam, etc. Women also formed groups, e.g., Moturi Udayam, Chintala Koteswaramma, Mahankali Lakshmi, Sridevi sisters, etc. Popular non-Hindu artists are Abraham Bhagavatar, Manohara Kavi, Khader Khan Sahib, Shaik Nazar etc.

Shaik Nazar popularized this by performing on various contemporary issues at that time and gained people's recognition. He is popularly known as "Father of Burrakatha."

Modern form
The main storyteller (kathakudu) narrates the story. He plays tambura and dances to music. He also wears a metal ring called an andelu on his right thumb, holds another ring in his other hand and adds more music by colliding them frequently.  The co-performers plays gummeta (also called dakki or budike), earthen drums with two heads. All three or only the kathakadu wear anklets (also called as gajjelu), which add even more music when they dance.

The right side performer (hasyaka, meaning joker) acts as a joker and cracks satires and jokes. The left side performer (rajakiya, meaning politician) acts as someone who knows worldly ways and talks about politics and social issues. The main performer and co-performers constantly was address each other. The co-performers interrupt the kathakudu with doubts, and they sometimes add emphasis to the main events in the story with short words similar to "Wow!" "Aha!" and "That is it."

Whenever the main performer sings a song, he or she starts with "vinara veera kumara veera gadha vinara" followed by the co-performers singing "tandhana tane tandhana na." It is also called 'tandana katha.'

Significance
Burra katha was a pastime event in villages. It is seen even now during Dussehra or Sankranti festival seasons to describe events in epics like Ramayan and Mahabharat and also some of best and moral stories of kings like kambojaraju katha, chinnamma katha, muggurumoratila katha, etc.

Present
Burrakatha tellers are called as budagajangalu. Internet and movies play a major role in modern life.
That's why the burrakathas are not being seen and no one is there to develop this and improve the art.
In past these burrakatha tellers were important in the villages; now there is no response for their art.

So these burrakatha tellers left their traditional art and have become beggars or day labourers. Even in these modern times, there are no educated people in this tribe. They don't have caste certificates for developing their tribe.

Daroji Eramma was a performer of Burra katha from Karnataka.

See also
 Jangam
 Kirtan
 Harikatha
 Oggu Katha
 Pravachan

References

Bibliography

External links
Ancient Jangam Katha
Burrakatha origins
Burrakatha description
Jangam Katha as art
Story telling techniques in south India

Drama
Hindu music
Indian styles of music
Culture of Andhra Pradesh
Hindu traditions
Storytelling
Performing arts in India